1517 Hebron attacks occurred in the final phases of the Ottoman–Mamluk War (1516–17), when Turkish Ottomans had ousted the Mamluks and taken Ottoman Syria. The massacre targeted the Jewish population of the city and is also referred to as a pogrom.

Events
An account of the event, recorded by Japheth ben Manasseh in 1518, mentions how the onslaught was initiated by Turkish troops led by Murad Bey, the deputy of the Sultan from Jerusalem. Jews were attacked, beaten and raped, and many were killed as their homes and businesses were looted and pillaged. It has been suggested that the stable financial position of the Hebronite Jews at the time was what attracted the Turkish soldiers to engage in the mass plunder. Others suggest the pogrom could have in fact taken place in the midst of a localised conflict, an uprising by the Mamluks against the new Ottoman rulers. Those who survived the calamity fled to Beirut and Jews only returned to Hebron 16 years later in 1533.

See also
1834 Hebron massacre
List of massacres in Ottoman Syria

References

1510s in Ottoman Syria
1517 in the Mamluk Sultanate
1517 in the Ottoman Empire
1517 riots
Anti-Jewish pogroms by Muslims
Antisemitism in the Ottoman Empire
Jews and Judaism in Hebron
Jews and Judaism in the Mamluk Sultanate
Jews and Judaism in Ottoman Palestine
Massacres in 1517
History of Hebron